Homicide Bureau is a 1939 American action film, directed by Charles C. Coleman. It stars Bruce Cabot, Rita Hayworth, and Marc Lawrence.

Cast
Bruce Cabot as Jim Logan
Rita Hayworth as J.G. Bliss
Marc Lawrence as Chuck Brown
Richard Fiske as Hank
Moroni Olsen as Captain Haines
Norman Willis as Briggs
Gene Morgan as Blake
Robert Paige as Thurston
Lee Prather as Jamison
Eddie Fetherston as Specks
Stanley Andrews as Police Commissioner

References

External links
Homicide Bureau at the Internet Movie Database

1939 films
American action films
1930s action films
Films directed by Charles C. Coleman
American black-and-white films
Columbia Pictures films
1930s American films